This is a list of the three current Comorian islands presidents.

Presidents of the islands

Notes

Presidents
Lists of national presidents
Presidents